Brigadier-General Charles Lawrence (14 December 1709 – 19 October 1760) was a British military officer who, as lieutenant governor and subsequently governor of Nova Scotia, is perhaps best known for overseeing the Expulsion of the Acadians and settling the New England Planters in Nova Scotia. He was born in Plymouth, England, and died in Halifax, Nova Scotia.  According to historian Elizabeth Griffiths, Lawrence was seen as a "competent", "efficient" officer with a "service record that had earned him fairly rapid promotion, a person of considerable administrative talent who was trusted by both Cornwallis and Hopson." He is buried in the crypt of St. Paul's Church (Halifax).

Early career
Lawrence was born in Plymouth (Devon) on 14 December 1709. He followed his father, General Charles John Lawrence, who is said to have served in Flanders under John Churchill, 1st Duke of Marlborough, into a military career.

Charles Lawrence's earlier life is obscure. He was commissioned in the 11th Regiment of Foot and served in the West Indies from 1733 until 1737. He then served in the War Office. He was made lieutenant in 1731 and then captain in 1745. He was wounded while serving with the 54th Foot in the Battle of Fontenoy in 1745.

Father Le Loutre's War

During Father Le Loutre's War, in 1749 he transferred again, to the 40th Foot. He participated in the Battle at Chignecto (1749) and then built Fort Lawrence on the south bank of the Missaguash River in the fall of 1750, and was promoted Lieutenant-Colonel the same year.  In 1753, he directed the settlement of the Foreign Protestants at Lunenburg, Nova Scotia, and suppressed the settlers' rebellion there. Lawrence mobilized rangers to prevent the Acadian Exodus as well as fight the Mi'kmaq.

French and Indian War

During the French and Indian War, in conjunction with Governor William Shirley of Massachusetts, he helped raise forces for the Battle of Fort Beauséjour on 16 June 1755. He wrote the deportation order, and orchestrated the various campaigns of the Expulsion of the Acadians, beginning with the Bay of Fundy Campaign (1755). After the native Raid on Lunenburg (1756), he placed a bounty on male native scalps.

Lawrence commissioned several armed patrol vessels to patrol the Nova Scotia coast as part of a provincial marine, including the ten-gun brigantine Montague in 1759.

As governor of Nova Scotia, Lawrence saw the settlement of the Acadian lands by New England Planters. In 1757, Lawrence was further promoted to the title of brigadier general and commanded one of the three divisions at the successful siege of the French fortress at Louisbourg on Île Royale (Cape Breton Island) in 1758.

He is said to have died of pneumonia in 1760 in Halifax, Nova Scotia and is buried under St. Paul's Church (Halifax).

According to his biographer, Dominique Graham,

Legacy 
 He is the namesake of Fort Lawrence, Nova Scotia and Lawrencetown, Nova Scotia, Lawrence St in Lunenburg
 namesake of a British privateer Lawrence

See also 

Military history of Nova Scotia
Military history of the Mi’kmaq People
Military history of the Acadians

References
Endnotes

Texts
 
 
 
 
 
 
 British critique of Lawrence for military government. 1756

External links

 Blupete.com biography
 proclamation of 1756
 Bartleby
 Girouard
 Cajun

Military history of Acadia
Military history of New England
Military history of the Thirteen Colonies
Canadian military personnel from Nova Scotia
1709 births
1760 deaths
Burials in Canada
Governors of the Colony of Nova Scotia
40th Regiment of Foot officers
Acadian history
British Army personnel of the War of the Austrian Succession
British military personnel of the French and Indian War
Military personnel from Plymouth, Devon
Devonshire Regiment officers
54th Regiment of Foot officers
Sherwood Foresters officers
South Lancashire Regiment officers
British Army brigadiers
Deaths from pneumonia in Nova Scotia
People of Father Le Loutre's War